, translated as Legend of the Dragon's Son, is a Japanese manga series written and illustrated by Yoshito Yamahara. It was serialized by Kodansha in Monthly Shōnen Magazine from 1993 to 2007 and collected in 37 tankōbon volumes; in 2005 it was reprinted in 10 bunkoban volumes. In 1997, it won the Kodansha Manga Award for shōnen manga. It is followed by a sequel series, which was serialized in Monthly Shōnen Magazine from 2007 to 2016 and collected in 17 volumes and later  from 2016 to present and collected in 7 volumes.

Outside Japan, all three series are licensed in Taiwan by Tong Li, in Indonesia by Elex Media Komputindo, and South Korea by Final.

Ryūrōden is about Japanese teenagers Shiro and Masumi who are swallowed by a dragon on flying to China on a junior high school trip. They find themselves in China in the year 207 during the prelude to the Three Kingdoms period, at the start of the campaign leading to the Battle of Red Cliffs. As they learn how to survive, in part through Shiro's knowledge of Luo Guanzhong's historical 14th century novel Romance of the Three Kingdoms (as well as his growing aptitude for martial arts), they become known as "Dragon Leader" and "Dragon Princess," working for Liu Bei and Cao Cao, respectively.

References

External links 
 Series page at Kodansha 
 

Shōnen manga
Comics set in the Three Kingdoms
Works based on Romance of the Three Kingdoms
Winner of Kodansha Manga Award (Shōnen)